Todirești is a commune in Vaslui County, Western Moldavia, Romania. It is composed of nine villages: Cotic, Drăgești, Huc, Plopoasa, Siliștea, Sofronești, Todirești, Valea Popii and Viișoara. It also included Rafaila village until 2004, when it was split off to form a separate commune.

References

Communes in Vaslui County
Localities in Western Moldavia